The Calgary Roughnecks are a lacrosse team based in Calgary playing in the National Lacrosse League (NLL). The 2009 season was the 8th in franchise history.  The Roughnecks finished the season with a franchise best 12–4 record to lead the league.  They won the Champion's Cup at home with a 12–10 victory over the New York Titans.

Regular season

Conference standings

Game log
Reference:

Playoffs

Game log
Reference:

Player stats
Reference:

Runners (Top 10)

Note: GP = Games played; G = Goals; A = Assists; Pts = Points; LB = Loose balls; PIM = Penalty minutes

Goaltenders
Note: GP = Games played; MIN = Minutes; W = Wins; L = Losses; GA = Goals against; Sv% = Save percentage; GAA = Goals against average

Transactions

New players
 Matt King - acquired in trade
 Kris Hartzell - acquired in trade
 Kyle Goundrey - signed as free agent

Players not returning
 Ryan McNish - traded
 Travis Gillespie - traded
 Steve Dietrich - traded
 Ryan Avery - Released

Trades

Entry draft
The 2008 NLL Entry Draft took place on September 7, 2008. The Roughnecks selected the following players:

Roster

See also
2009 NLL season

References

Calgary
National Lacrosse League Champion's Cup-winning seasons